Ski Canada is a special interest consumer magazine published for alpine (downhill) ski enthusiasts. The magazine is published by Solstice Publishing Inc. based in Toronto, Ontario. Ski Canada was launched in October 1972 by Col. Terry Whelpton and titled Ski Canada Journal with a focus on ski racing. In 1979, the magazine was purchased by Maclean Hunter Ltd. Editorial focus evolved to include all aspects of alpine skiing including gear reviews and ski tests, ski resort reports, instruction and commentary. In 1990, Maclean Hunter sold the magazine to Solstice Publishing Inc., a company established by publisher Paul Green.

References

External links

Sports magazines published in Canada
Magazines established in 1972
Magazines published in Toronto
1972 establishments in Ontario